Scripps News is an American news network headquartered in Atlanta, Georgia, and owned by the E. W. Scripps Company.  It was previously known as Newsy, from its launch in 2008 until December 31, 2022.

Its content is available for free on OTT platforms including Pluto TV, The Roku Channel, Xumo, Haystack News and Samsung TV Plus, in addition to streaming devices such as Roku, Apple TV and Amazon Fire TV. It is also available for free on more than 300 over-the-air stations, as of October 2021. Internationally, Scripps News was carried in Canada by RiverTV on channel 26.

History 

Newsy was founded in 2008. In its early years, Newsy operated primarily as a syndication business, selling news and original content to major digital journalism brands that included AOL/Huffington Post, Microsoft and Mashable.

In January 2014, Newsy was acquired for $35 million by the E. W. Scripps Company.

In September 2017, Scripps announced it would take over RLTV's (Retirement Living Television) cable and satellite carriage agreements for approximately 26 million subscribers and reprogram the network with Newsy's lineup of shows.

Newsy has six U.S. offices: Columbia, Missouri (which is part of a co-collaboration with Scripps with Mizzou's Missouri School of Journalism) Chicago; Cincinnati; New York; Denver; and Washington, D.C.

On April 6, 2021, Scripps announced that it would expand Newsy into a free over-the-air network, as well as being available on streaming platforms, starting October 1. The network would be available over-the-air on Scripps-owned Ion Television stations, along with some traditional Scripps stations without an Ion sister station and the former Ion-owned stations transferred to Inyo Broadcast Holdings, along with offering the network to other station groups. It also announced plans to relocate Newsy's national headquarters to Atlanta. The Newsy over-the-air network launched on October 1, 2021, debuting a new logo and graphical identity (created by Elevation) that day as well; the current identity and goal of Newsy is designed to provide "balanced", impartial reporting without political punditry or debates endemic to their cable news competitors.

In advance of the move exclusively to over-the-air distribution, Scripps began to notify traditional cable and satellite providers, along with Internet television providers, at the end of March that it would end distribution of the network via those means on June 30, 2021, ending the nearly 15-year life of the channel space, including its time as RLTV.

On September 29, 2022, Scripps announced that Newsy would be renamed Scripps News on January 1, 2023. The rebranding comes as part of the establishment of a new national news department of the same name at Scripps, combining its Washington bureau with the national bureau of its local station group.

Affiliates 
, Scripps News has current and pending affiliation agreements with 332 television stations in over 100 television markets encompassing 46 states, covering 86.28% of the United States.

Awards 
Scripps News's editorial content, as well as its TV apps, have won the following awards:
 Apple TV's Best of 2015 list
 National Edward R. Murrow award for its news documentary, "The War and Money Project" (2015)
 Society of Environmental Journalists Awards for Reporting on the Environment (2018)
 Online Journalism Award for its investigation, "Case Cleared" (2019)
 Investigative journalism award from the Society of Professional Journalists for "Case Cleared" (2019)
 National Edward R. Murrow award for its news documentary, "Walkout" (2019)
 Robert F. Kennedy Journalism Award for "A Broken Trust" (2020)
 Scripps Howard Award for innovation for its newsroom collaboration, "Newsy+Bellingcat" (2020)

Scripps News's editorial content has also been nominated for numerous awards including:
 The News & Documentary Emmy Awards
 The Digiday Publishing Awards
 The Webby Awards

References

External links 

 
 The War and Money Project, a Newsy's documentary

2008 establishments in Missouri
American news websites
24-hour television news channels in the United States
E. W. Scripps Company
Television channels and stations established in 2008
English-language television stations in the United States
Companies based in Columbia, Missouri
2014 mergers and acquisitions